The 2021 MTV Africa Music Awards ceremony was postponed. The event was set to be held in Kampala, Uganda. The award ceremony, was to be aired live on MTV Base, and MTV was to air the event globally, in 180 countries, for the first time, according to Paul Grein of Billboard. The show was to be hosted virtually by DJ Khaled in the City of Miami. The ceremony was set to feature performances from various African celebrities; Wizkid, Sheebah Karungi, Diamond Platnumz, Khaligraph Jones, Nasty C, Suspect 95, Soraia Ramos, and Calema, among others.  The repeat show will also be aired on BET Africa, BET International, and MTV channels.

It was due to bring back the Listener's Choice category, with top 20 "Listener's Choice" finalists. The ceremony sponsor was Uganda, The Pearl of Africa. On 4 February 2021, the organizers of the MAMA's Awards, announced the postponement of the award in a statement via E-mail with The Punch, it stated "MTV Base is concerned about the current health and safety challenges". It sustained international campaign urging individual artists to boycott the event. "We will keep fans updated as we have more news," a statement tweeted by MTV Base Africa. Following the allegations of human rights violations against the President of Uganda, Yoweri Museveni, citing the post-election confinement of former presidential candidate Bobi Wine. Christine Orr, started a petition to cancel the ceremony.

Performers

Wizkid
Sheebah Karungi
Diamond Platnumz
Khaligraph Jones
Nasty C
Suspect 95
Soraia Ramos
Calema

Nominees
The following is a list of nominees

Note
The MTV Africa Music Awards, brings back the Listener's Choice category for the third time.

References

MTV Africa Music Awards
2021 in Uganda
2021 in Africa
2021 music awards